HMS Anson was a  battleship of the Royal Navy, named after Admiral George Anson. She was built by Swan Hunter and Wigham Richardson Shipyard and launched on 24 February 1940, being completed on 22 June 1942. Her completion was delayed to allow the fitting of fire-control radar and additional anti-aircraft weapons. She was originally to have been named Jellicoe, but was renamed Anson in February 1940.

Anson saw service in the Second World War, escorting nine Russian convoys in the Arctic by December 1943. She took part in diversionary moves to draw attention away from Operation Husky in July 1943. In October the same year she took part in Operation Leader. Rear Admiral Cecil Harcourt accepted the surrender of Japanese forces occupying Hong Kong on board Anson in August 1945, and after the end of the war the vessel became the flagship of the 1st Battle Squadron of the British Pacific Fleet.

Anson arrived back in British waters on 29 July 1946, spending the next three years in active service with the post-war navy. She was finally placed in reserve and "mothballed" in 1949, spending eight years in this condition. On 17 December 1957 she was purchased for scrap by Shipbreaking Industries, Faslane.

Construction 

In the aftermath of the First World War, the Washington Naval Treaty was drawn up in 1922 in an effort to stop an arms race developing between Britain, Japan, France, Italy and the United States. This treaty limited the number of ships each nation was allowed to build and capped the displacement of all capital ships at 35,000 long tons. These restrictions were extended in 1930 through the London Naval Treaty, however, in 1935 Japan and Italy would not agree to the Second London Naval Treaty for further armament control.

Concerned by a lack of modern battleships within their navy, the Admiralty ordered the construction of a new battleship class: the King George V class. Due to the pressing need for the ships, the British, unlike the US, could not delay to take advantage of an escalator clause that would allow 16-inch guns. The ships were the only ones to be built at the time to adhere to the treaty and even though it soon became apparent to the British that the other signatories to the treaty were ignoring its requirements, it was too late to change the design of the class before they were laid down in 1937.

The keel of the fourth ship of the class was laid at the Swan Hunter and Wigham Richardson Shipyard on 20 July 1937. She was originally to have been named Jellicoe, after Admiral Sir John Jellicoe, the commander of the Grand Fleet at the Battle of Jutland in 1916, but she was renamed Anson in February 1940. Anson was launched on 24 February 1940 and was completed on 22 June 1942. Completion was delayed largely because of the inclusion of fire-control radar, and additional anti-aircraft weapons.

Description 

Anson displaced  on trials in 1942 and  fully loaded in 1945.

She was powered by Parsons geared steam turbines driving four propeller shafts. Steam was provided by eight Admiralty 3-drum water-tube boilers which normally delivered , but could deliver  at emergency overload.
The ship carried  of fuel oil.

Armament 
Ansons main armament was ten BL  Mk VII guns. The 14-inch guns were mounted in three turrets; one Mark III quadruple turret forward and one aft, and one Mark II twin turret forward firing over the quadruple turret. The guns could be elevated 40 degrees and depressed 3 degrees. Her secondary armament consisted of 16 QF  Mk I guns which were mounted in eight twin mounts. The guns could be elevated to 70 degrees and depressed to 5 degrees. The normal rate of fire was ten to twelve rounds per minute, but in practice the guns could only fire seven to eight rounds per minute. Along with her main and secondary batteries Anson carried six 8-barrelled QF 2-pounder Mk. VIII (40 mm) "pom-pom" anti-aircraft guns. These were supplemented by eighteen  Oerlikon light AA guns.

Operational history 

After her commissioning in 1942, Anson was sent to the Arctic Sea with most of the Home Fleet as an escort ship for Russian convoys. On 29 January, Convoy RA 52 departed from the Kola inlet, with distant cover provided by Anson, the cruiser Sheffield and the destroyers Inglefield,  and the Polish destroyer Orkan from 30 January.

In June 1942, the pre-First World War battleship  was disguised as Anson in the Mediterranean Sea, acting as a decoy during Operation Vigorous. In July 1943 Anson took part in the diversionary moves designed to draw attention away from the preparations for Operation Husky, and in October that year, with Duke of York and the US cruiser , provided cover for Operation Leader, in which the US aircraft carrier  mounted air strikes against German shipping off Norway.

Anson was decommissioned for a refit in June 1944 and did not return to the fleet until March 1945, when she sailed with Duke of York to join the British Pacific Fleet. By the time she arrived in the theatre, hostilities were all but over. She left Sydney on 15 August for Hong Kong with Duke of York, and along with a task force of other ships from Britain and the Commonwealth, accepted the surrender of the Japanese forces occupying Hong Kong. She was also present in Tokyo Bay during the official Japanese surrender aboard .

It is reported that Anson never once fired her main armament in anger.

Post war era
Following the war Anson was the flagship of the 1st Battle Squadron of the British Pacific Fleet and helped to liberate Hong Kong. After a brief refit, Anson sailed from Sydney to Hobart in February 1946 to collect the Duke and Duchess of Gloucester (the Duke was then Governor-General of Australia) and return them to Sydney.

Anson arrived back in British waters on 29 July 1946 and after a short refit was returned to peacetime duties. In November 1949, Anson was placed in reserve and in 1951 she was towed to Gare Loch. On 17 December 1957 she was purchased for scrap by Shipbreaking Industries, Faslane. A selection of her timbers would be reused to make souvenirs of different types.

Refits 
During her career, Anson was refitted on several occasions in order to update her equipment. The following are the dates and details of the refits undertaken:

References

Notes

Citations

Bibliography

External links 

 HMS Anson on naval-history.net
 Maritimequest HMS Anson Photo Gallery
 HMS Anson Association

 

King George V-class battleships (1939)
World War II battleships of the United Kingdom
Ships built by Swan Hunter
1940 ships